The 2020 ACC Championship Game was a college football game played on Saturday, December 19, 2020, at Bank of America Stadium in Charlotte. This was the 16th ACC Championship Game and determined the 2020 champion of the Atlantic Coast Conference. This season, the ACC used a one division format. Instead of representatives from two divisions, the two teams with the best conference records earned a spot in the game. Sponsored by restaurant chain Subway, the game was known as the ACC Championship Game presented by Subway.

The game was originally scheduled for December 5. However, the COVID-19 pandemic pushed the game back to either December 12 or 19 when the revised ACC schedule was released and subsequently to December 19. Attendance for the game was capped at 5,240, or 7% of the capacity of Bank of America Stadium due to Governor Roy Cooper's order limiting outdoor stadiums to 7% capacity.

Previous season
The 2019 ACC Championship Game featured Clemson against Virginia. It was Virginia's first appearance in the conference title game. In the championship game, Clemson was victorious by a score of 62–17, winning its fifth consecutive ACC conference championship and 19th overall. Virginia went on to play in the 2019 Orange Bowl, while Clemson went on to play in the 2020 College Football Playoff National Championship.

Teams

Clemson

Clemson entered the championship game with a record of 9–1 (8–1 in conference play). Their only defeat of the season was to Notre Dame on November 7, a double-overtime loss in a game played without starting Tigers quarterback Trevor Lawrence. Clemson had a record of 6–1 in prior ACC Championship Games, having won each of the prior five games (2015–2019) and having only lost in 2009.

Notre Dame

Notre Dame entered the championship game with a record of 10–0 (9–0 in conference play). Their narrowest margin of victory, outside of the double-overtime contest with Clemson, was a 12–7 win over Louisville in mid-October. Notre Dame historically competes in football as an independent, but played the 2020 season as a member of the ACC following a delayed start to the season and factors related to the COVID-19 pandemic. As such, this was Notre Dame's first appearance in an ACC Championship Game.

Game summary

Statistics

See also
 List of Atlantic Coast Conference football champions

References

External links
Game statistics at statbroadcast.com

ACC Championship Game
Championship
Clemson Tigers football games
Notre Dame Fighting Irish football games
ACC Championship Game
ACC Championship Game